A dual mandate is holding two elected public offices simultaneously.

Dual mandate may also refer to:
 The Dual Mandate in British Tropical Africa, 1922 book by Frederick Lugard
 U. S. Federal Reserve System's two main objectives: controlling inflation and promoting employment

See also
 Mandate (disambiguation)